Miravalles Jorge Manuel Dengo National Park (is a national park and nature reserve in the northwest part of Costa Rica, which forms part of the Arenal Tempisque Conservation Area. The site contains the Miravalles Volcano, which is still active although the last recorded eruption was only of steam vents in 1946. 

On 5 June 2019, it was created by allocating  from Miravalles Protected Zone as declared by Executive Decree 41768-MINAE, it became the twenty ninth national park of Costa Rica.

Economy 

Nearby there is a geothermal energy plant which uses the large underground heated reservoir to provide electricity.  In the same premises is also located the Miravalles Solar Park.

References

External links 
 Miravalles Protected Zone at Costa Rica National Parks

National parks of Costa Rica